Crazy-Quilt is the name of several characters in DC Comics.

Publication history
The Earth-Two Crazy Quilt first appeared in Boy Commandos #15 (March 1946) and was created by Jack Kirby.

The Paul Dekker version of Crazy Quilt first appeared in Blackhawks #180 and was created by artist Dick Dillon and an uncredited writer.

The unidentified female version of Crazy Quilt first appeared in Villains United #2 and was created by Gail Simone and Dale Eaglesham.

Fictional character biography

Earth-Two Crazy Quilt
Crazy Quilt is an unnamed noted painter who leads a double-life as a master criminal. He gives the plans for his crimes to various henchmen through clues left in his paintings. His criminal empire crashes to a halt when one of his henchmen double-crosses him. Blinded by a gunshot wound, he volunteers for an experimental procedure that restores his vision, but is left unable to see anything but bright colors. In his second published appearance, this is combined with a special helmet that emits bright colored lights, enabling him to see under most circumstances.

Paul Dekker
In a 1963 issue of Blackhawk taking place on Earth-One, a fence named Paul Dekker uses the name Crazy Quilt, but the title heroes capture him. As a result of this appearance, some resources report the original Crazy-Quilt's true identity as Dekker. This includes at least one comic, the Kevin Smith-penned Batman: The Widening Gyre #4. However, the earlier Batman Encyclopedia, another official source endorsed by DC Comics, states that Dekker is a separate character from the original Crazy Quilt.

In the Post-Crisis, Paul Dekker's history is similar to the Earth-Two Crazy Quilt. Crazy Quilt's sight is restored briefly for a time after he kidnaps a surgeon to assist him. Batman and Robin intervene. In self-defense, Robin reflects the madman's light beams back into his newly restored eyes. Unintentionally, Quilt is permanently blinded. Obsessing over his young adversary, he becomes one of the few bat-villains to hate Robin more than his mentor.

Later, thinking to enact his revenge upon Grayson, he mistakenly takes out his aggression on Jason Todd, who was new to the role at the time. Todd is nearly beaten to death. Again, it is Robin who is pivotal to stopping Crazy Quilt's plans.

Crazy Quilt later fought Jason Todd after knocking Batman unconscious.

When Ra's al Ghul caused a mass prison break at Arkham Asylum and Blackgate Penitentiary, Crazy Quilt was among the freed inmates that worked for Ra's al Ghul by abducting Alfred Pennyworth, Commissioner James Gordon, Vicki Vale, Harvey Bullock, and Julia Pennyworth.

Crazy Quilt was later seen in Arkham Asylum when Batman was Arkham Asylum's latest patient. He joins the other inmates in attacking Batman who ends up defeating them.

During the Underworld Unleashed storyline, Crazy Quilt was among those who were offered a carved black candle of Neron.

Crazy Quilt appears in the Belle Reve riot in Justice League #34, lugging around the eviscerated body of the prison warden. The prisoners, along with much of humanity, were being affected by the entity Mageddon. It had affected fellow prisoner, telepath Hector Hammond, who then altered the minds of the inmates.

Crazy Quilt also has a role in one of the many reincarnations of the Secret Society of Super Villains. He and dozens of villains gather in response to the JLA's new moonbase and extended team efforts. During the meeting, Quilt has his outfit insulted by the Monocle. The meeting turns out to be a JLA trap and all the villains are captured.

In The New 52 (a 2011 reboot of the DC Comics universe) during the story arc Batman: Endgame, Dr. Paul Dekker appears as insane ex Wayne Enterprises geneticist Batman suspects supplied the Joker with his newest serum filled with Dionesium, but is found out to not be guilty. He is also a member of the Doctors Three along with Doctor Death and Hugo Strange. Dekker calls out claiming that the Joker has given him the opportunity to become one of the "Dionesium Men" as well and gleefully injects himself with a syringe despite Batman's warnings. Almost immediately, Dekker's tissues begin to decay and rot from his body and he drops from the window into the waiting crowd of infected who tear what remains of him to pieces. In a nod to his Pre-Crisis alter ego, Dekker is found covering his nude body with a patchwork quilt.

Female Crazy Quilt
Apparently the Society, led by Alexander Luthor, Jr., has in its roster a new version of Crazy Quilt, a female one with the characteristic costume and vision-helmet of the previous villain. She has appeared in the Villains United series. She works with many other supervillains to take down the 'Secret Six'. In Outsiders #50, she is captured by the Suicide Squad.

In the Secret Six series, she is one of the villains who accepts the offer of a bounty on the heads of the Secret Six from mysterious crime boss, Junior. She is possibly shot by the Six, and stabbed in the stomach by Scandal.

She later appears in James Robinson's Justice League: Cry For Justice miniseries as one of the many villains who attacks the team.

Skills and equipment
Crazy Quilt has a helmet that allows him to hypnotize his victims using colorful flashing lights. It can project lethal laser beams and function as artificial eyes since because his original ones do not work anymore. The lenses feed their input signals straight into his brain. All versions possess expertise in gadgetry.

In other media

Television
 The Paul Dekker incarnation of Crazy Quilt appears in Batman: The Brave and the Bold, voiced by Jeffrey Tambor.
 The Paul Dekker incarnation of Crazy Quilt appears in DC Super Hero Girls, voiced by Tom Kenny. This version is a teacher at Super Hero High.

Film
Crazy Quilt appears in The Lego Batman Movie.

See also
 List of Batman family enemies

References

Characters created by Dale Eaglesham
Characters created by Gail Simone
Characters created by Jack Kirby
Comics characters introduced in 1946
Comics characters introduced in 1963
Comics characters introduced in 2005
DC Comics male supervillains
DC Comics scientists
Fictional artists
Fictional blind characters
Fictional hypnotists and indoctrinators
Fictional thieves
Golden Age supervillains